The canton of Saint-Maximin-la-Sainte-Baume is an administrative division of the Var department, southeastern France. Its borders were modified at the French canton reorganisation which came into effect in March 2015. Its seat is in Saint-Maximin-la-Sainte-Baume.

It consists of the following communes:

Artigues
Barjols
Bras
Brue-Auriac
Châteauvert
Esparron
Ginasservis
Ollières
Pontevès
Pourcieux
Pourrières
Rians
Saint-Julien
Saint-Martin-de-Pallières
Saint-Maximin-la-Sainte-Baume
Seillons-Source-d'Argens
Varages
La Verdière
Vinon-sur-Verdon

References

Cantons of Var (department)